Terra de Soneira is a comarca in the Galician Province of A Coruña, Spain. The overall population of this  local region is 20,886 (2005).

Municipalities

Camariñas, Vimianzo and Zas.

Terra de Soneira